The MLS Inaugural Player Draft, held before Major League Soccer's initial 1996 season, distributed players to the league's ten inaugural teams. The Inaugural Player Draft occurred on February 6 and 7, 1996 after each team was allocated four marquee players.

Round 1

Round 2

Round 3

Round 4

Round 5

Round 6

Round 7

Round 8

Round 9

Round 10

Round 11

Round 12

Round 13

Round 14

Round 15

Round 16

Major League Soccer drafts